Wilfred U. Codrington III (born March 6, 1983) is an American legal scholar who is an associate professor at Brooklyn Law School and previously a fellow at the Brennan Center for Justice. A specialist in constitution law, election law, and voting rights, Codrington is a regular contributor to The Atlantic.

Education 
Codrington earned a Bachelor of Arts degree from Brown University, a Master of Public Administration from the University of Pennsylvania, and a Juris Doctor from Stanford Law School.

Career 
Codrington served as a law clerk for Judge Deborah Batts. He also worked as a legislative assistant and counsel in the office of Congresswoman Eleanor Holmes Norton. After graduating from law school, he worked as an associate attorney at DLA Piper. Codrington was the Bernard and Anne Spitzer Fellow at the Brennan Center for Justice. He also worked as a professor in the Robert F. Wagner Graduate School of Public Service. He later joined Brooklyn Law School. Codrington writes about election reform and voting rights for The Atlantic. In 2021, Codrington co-authored, with John F. Kowal, The People’s Constitution. Codrington has also been featured as a guest on KDNK.

References 

Living people
Brown University alumni
University of Pennsylvania alumni
Stanford Law School alumni
New York University faculty
Brooklyn Law School faculty
1983 births
People from Bridgeport, Connecticut
Lawyers from Bridgeport, Connecticut